Golovino is a rural locality (a village) in Filippovskoye Rural Settlement, Kirzhachsky District, Vladimir Oblast, Russia. The population was 4 as of 2010. There are 21 streets.

Geography 
Golovino is located 32 km southwest of Kirzhach (the district's administrative centre) by road. Bynino is the nearest rural locality.

References 

Rural localities in Kirzhachsky District